Walter Frederick Moser (February 27, 1881 – December 10, 1946) was an American pitcher in Major League Baseball who played for the Philadelphia Phillies during the  season and with the Boston Red Sox and St. Louis Browns in . He was born in Concord, North Carolina, United States.

In a two-season career, Moser posted a 0–7 record with 4.58 earned run average in 14 appearances, including nine starts, 30 strikeouts, 30 walk, 97 hits allowed, and   innings of work. 
 
Moser died at the age of 65 in Philadelphia.

References

External links

Retrosheet

1881 births
1946 deaths
Boston Red Sox players
Philadelphia Phillies players
St. Louis Browns players
Major League Baseball pitchers
Lynchburg Shoemakers players
Trenton Tigers players
Lancaster Red Roses players
Oakland Oaks (baseball) players
Atlantic City (minor league baseball) players
Baseball players from North Carolina
People from Concord, North Carolina